The Elenchidae are an insect family in the order Strepsiptera.

References

External links

Strepsiptera
Insect families
Taxa named by Robert Cyril Layton Perkins